El Pan Canton is a canton of Ecuador, located in the Azuay Province.  Its capital is the town of El Pan.  Its population at the 2001 census was 3,075.

Demographics
Ethnic groups as of the Ecuadorian census of 2010:
Mestizo  92.5%
White  5.8%
Afro-Ecuadorian  1.4%
Montubio  0.3%
Indigenous  0.0%
Other  0.1%

References

Cantons of Azuay Province